Ellsworth is a village in Antrim County in the U.S. state of Michigan. The population was 349 at the 2010 census. The village is located within Banks Township.

The village is primarily a bedroom community with its primary industry being gravel and other aggregates. Agriculture and forestry are also important industries. Ellsworth is home to a small annual festival called the Pig Roast, which involves a parade and horse pulls, and of course, roast pork. Down the street is a bistro called the Rowe Inn. Ellsworth is the seat of Banks Township, which also includes the community of Atwood and several cherry orchards. Ellsworth's main governing body is the Ellsworth Village Council. The town is named after Elmer Ephraim Ellsworth, the first Union officer to die in the American Civil War.

History

The village of Ellsworth was founded in 1881.  It quickly took in the previous villages of Needmore and Ox Bow.  It was incorporated as a village in 1938.

Geography

Demographics

2010 census
As of the census of 2010, there were 349 people, 142 households, and 100 families residing in the village. The racial makeup of the village was 97.1% White, 0.6% African American, 0.9% from other races, and 1.4% from two or more races. Hispanic or Latino of any race were 0.6% of the population.

There were 142 households, of which 30.3% had children under the age of 18 living with them, 58.5% were married couples living together, 10.6% had a female householder with no husband present, 1.4% had a male householder with no wife present, and 29.6% were non-families. 28.2% of all households were made up of individuals, and 11.9% had someone living alone who was 65 years of age or older. The average household size was 2.42 and the average family size was 2.94.

The median age in the village was 42.9 years. 24.9% of residents were under the age of 18; 4.7% were between the ages of 18 and 24; 22.6% were from 25 to 44; 32.4% were from 45 to 64; and 15.5% were 65 years of age or older. The gender makeup of the village was 47.9% male and 52.1% female.

2000 census
As of the census of 2000, there were 483 people, 174 households, and 132 families residing in the village. The racial makeup of the village was 96.48% White, 0.21% African American, 0.41% Native American, 1.04% from other races, and 1.86% from two or more races. Hispanic or Latino of any race were 1.04% of the population.

There were 174 households, out of which 43.1% had children under the age of 18 living with them, 61.5% were married couples living together, 10.3% had a female householder with no husband present, and 24.1% were non-families. 20.7% of all households were made up of individuals, and 11.5% had someone living alone who was 65 years of age or older.  The average household size was 2.78 and the average family size was 3.17.

In the village, the population was spread out, with 31.1% under the age of 18, 7.5% from 18 to 24, 29.8% from 25 to 44, 21.1% from 45 to 64, and 10.6% who were 65 years of age or older.  The median age was 33 years. For every 100 females, there were 96.3 males.  For every 100 females age 18 and over, there were 91.4 males.

The median income for a household in the village was $38,125, and the median income for a family was $45,694. Males had a median income of $34,375 versus $26,719 for females. The per capita income for the village was $16,781.  About 5.5% of families and 7.3% of the population were below the poverty line, including 9.2% of those under age 18 and 19.0% of those age 65 or over.

References

Villages in Antrim County, Michigan
Villages in Michigan
1938 establishments in Michigan
Populated places established in 1938